Felix Victor Birch-Hirschfeld (2 May 1842 – 19 November 1899) was a German pathologist who was a native of Kluvensieck bei Rendsburg.

Biography 
In 1867 he received his medical doctorate from the University of Leipzig, where he studied under Carl Reinhold August Wunderlich (1815–1877) and Ernst Leberecht Wagner (1828–1888). In 1870 he became a prosector at the city hospital in Dresden, and in 1885 returned to Leipzig, where he succeeded Julius Cohnheim (1839–1884) as chair of pathological anatomy. One of his better known assistants was pathologist Christian Georg Schmorl (1861–1932).

Birch-Hirschfeld made important contributions in several facets of pathological medicine. He is known for his work in the field of bacteriology, with tuberculosis being the primary focus in regards to infectious diseases. In 1898 he described the unitary nature of nephroblastoma.

Associated eponym 
 "Birch-Hirschfeld stain": A stain that was formerly used for demonstrating amyloid, and consisted of a mixture of Bismarck brown and crystal violet.

Selected writings 
 Lehrbuch der Pathologischen Anatomie, (Textbook of pathological anatomy) Leipsig, 1877
 Die Entstehung der Gelbsucht neugeborener Kinder, (The emergence of jaundice in newborn children); Virchow's Archiv für pathologische Anatomie und Physiologie und für klinische Medicin, Berlin, LXXXVII. 
 The Skrophulose, In: Hugo Wilhelm von Ziemssen's "Handbuch der speciellen Pathologie und Therapie". Volume XIII; second edition 
 Grundriss der Allgemeinen Pathologie, (Outline of general pathology) Leipzig, 1892
 Über die Krankheiten der Leber und Milz, (On diseases of the liver and spleen). In: Carl Jakob Adolf Christian Gerhardt's "Handbuch der Kinderkrankheiten". Volume IV, Tübingen, H. Laupp, (1877–1893).

See also
 Pathology
 List of pathologists

References 
 Felix Victor Birch-Hirschfeld @ Who Named It

1842 births
1899 deaths
People from Rendsburg-Eckernförde
German pathologists
Members of the First Chamber of the Diet of the Kingdom of Saxony
Academic staff of Leipzig University
Leipzig University alumni